Strike Zones is a concerto for percussion and orchestra by the American composer Joan Tower.  The work was commissioned by the National Symphony Orchestra through a grant by the John and June Hechinger Commissioning Fund.  It was first performed at the John F. Kennedy Center for the Performing Arts on October 4, 2001, by the percussionist Evelyn Glennie and the National Symphony Orchestra under the conductor Leonard Slatkin.

Composition
Strike Zones has a duration of 20 minutes and is composed in a single movement.  Tower described her inspiration for the title of the concerto in the score program notes, writing:

Instrumentation
The work is scored for a solo percussionist and an orchestra comprising two flutes (both doubling piccolo), two oboes, two clarinets, two bassoons, four horns, three trumpets, three trombones, timpani, two antiphonal percussionists, piano (doubling celesta), and strings.

Reception
Reviewing the world premiere, Philip Kennicott of The Washington Post praised Tower's concerto, writing:
The Washington Times was more critical of the work, however, saying Strike Zones "left much to be desired, although it is a different kind of work."  The review further remarked:
Paul Griffiths of The New York Times wrote, "If uncertain in form (...), it included many beautiful moments, for the orchestra with or without the soloist."  He added:

References

Concertos by Joan Tower
2001 compositions
Percussion concertos
Music commissioned by the National Symphony Orchestra